Job ads aggregator - also known as search engine for job ads - is a website that aggregates job ads from various job boards, multiposter sites, as well as from direct employers and employment agencies.

Job aggregation market was pioneered by Indeed which remains the biggest job ads aggregator today as per Similar Web rankings. However, its incumbent status has been challenged by many competitors. 
In 2017 Google joined the race launching Google for Jobs.

References

Aggregation websites
Employment websites